Simone Bonomi (born 8 November 1980) is an Italian former association footballer who played as a midfielder.

Career
Bonomi started his career at A.C. Milan youth teams. In 1999, he was signed by Serie C2 club Prato in co-ownership bid. He played 50 times in the league, and also played 5 times in the playoff (2000, 2001). In summer 2001, he joined Avellino of Serie C1 in joint-ownership bid. In January 2002, he joined Poggibonsi of Serie C2 on loan, and also played once in relegation playoff.

Siena
In summer 2002, Bonomi joined A.C. Siena of Serie B. He never became a regular of the team, although made his Serie A debut on 25 October 2003 against U.S. Lecce. He played 5 times in Serie A before left for Serie A rival Chievo on loan. In 2004–05 and 2005–06, Bonomi was loaned to Napoli (Serie C1) and Verona (Serie B) respectively. He also played 4 times for Napoli in Serie C1 playoff.

Crotone, Bari & Perugia
In summer 2006, he joined F.C. Crotone and followed the team relegated to Serie C1. He played twice in Serie C1 playoff for Crotone. In July 2008, he joined A.S. Bari of Serie B, signed a 2-year contract.

In August 2009, he signed a 1-year contract with Perugia.

Going south: Sorrento
On 25 July 2011 Bonomi signed a 2-year deal that will keep him with the club until 2013.

As of December 2011 he has made 13 appearances for the club and is sticking to his (earlier) word that he had come to the club to improve, by turning in some commendable appearances.

Honours
Siena
Serie B winner: 2003

Bari
Serie B winner: 2009

Napoli
Serie C1 playoff runner-up: 2005

Prato
Serie C2 playoff runner-up: 2001

References

External links
http://www.asbari.it/index.php?option=com_campionato&task=giocatore&giocatore=2704
http://www.gazzetta.it/Speciali/serie_b_2007/giocatori/bonomi_sim.shtml

Italian footballers
Italy youth international footballers
A.C. Milan players
A.C. Prato players
U.S. Avellino 1912 players
A.C.N. Siena 1904 players
A.C. ChievoVerona players
S.S.C. Napoli players
Hellas Verona F.C. players
F.C. Crotone players
S.S.C. Bari players
A.C. Perugia Calcio players
U.S. Alessandria Calcio 1912 players
A.S.D. Sorrento players
Serie A players
Serie B players
Association football midfielders
Footballers from Milan
1980 births
Living people